Amma Rajyam Lo Kadapa Biddalu is an Indian Telugu-language political satire film directed by Siddartha Thatolu and Ram Gopal Varma and produced by Ajay Mysore. The film stars Ajmal Ameer, Dhananjay Prabhune, Brahmanandam,  and Ali. The plot depicts the political rivalry between the two dominant castes of Andhra Pradesh, namely, Reddy and Kamma, at the onset of 2019 Legislative Assembly election.

Plot

Cast 
 Ajmal Ameer as V. S. Jagannnath Reddy
 Dhananjay Prabhune as Babu, former Chief Minister
 Brahmanandam as Rambabu, driver of Babu
 Ali as Speaker Pammineni Ram
 Prudhvi Raj as Political expert
 Srikanth Iyyengar as Dayaneni Rama
 Dheeraj KV as Aakash Babu
 Kathi Mahesh as Special officer
 Swapna as Police Inspector
 Dhanraj as Gangaveeti Bhavani
 Rakesh Bhavsar 
 Jaffar Babu as himself
Ram Gopal Varma as himself

Soundtrack 

Music is composed by Ravi Shankar.

Release 
The film, originally titled Kamma Rajyam Lo Kadapa Reddlu, was scheduled to release on 29 November 2019, but postponed due to censor issue and Telangana High Court has put a stay to change the title of the film. After censor clearance Ram Gopal Varma announced the release date as 12 December 2019.

Marketing 
A first look poster was released on 7 September 2019. Another poster was released on 25 October 2019 revealing the characters and announcing the trailer release date and time. The trailer was released on the occasion of Diwali, 27 October 2019.

Reception 
The Times of India gave 1.5 of 5 stars and stated, "Be it movies or politics, the only thing people of this country want is entertainment,” says RGV in a grand statement, "but where is the entertainment in ARKB, we ask? All we see is a film that's a hot mess of random scenes stitched together." The Hans India gave 2 of 5 stars and stated, "The movie doesn't have a solid story which will be the biggest minus point of this film. Director Siddharth Thatholu along with the supervision of Ram Gopal Varma focused more on the unnecessary elevations for the hero and the slow-paced narration will test the patience of the audience. The performances are decent but the story execution is very poor. The screenplay is also terrible and most of the scenes don't have any connection. Also, the violence and the bloodshed in the film will irk some sections of the audience. Especially, the second half is extremely slow and some of the scenes are just logicless".

Notes

References 

2019 films
Films set in Andhra Pradesh
2010s Telugu-language films
Comedy-drama films based on actual events
Films directed by Ram Gopal Varma
Indian satirical films
Indian films based on actual events
Films about public opinion
Journalism adapted into films
Indian political satire films
Indian political comedy-drama films
Films about elections
Films set in India
2010s political comedy-drama films